The IPSC Hellenic Handgun Championship is an IPSC level 3 championship held once a year by the Hellenic Shooting Federation.

Champions 
The following is a list of current and previous champions.

Overall category

See also 
Hellenic Rifle Championship
Hellenic Shotgun Championship
Hellenic Tournament Championship

References 

Match Results - 2003 IPSC Hellenic 3gun Handgun Championship
Match Results - 2004 IPSC Hellenic Handgun Championship
Match Results - 2005 IPSC Hellenic Handgun Championship
Match Results - 2006 IPSC Hellenic Handgun Championship
Match Results - 2007 IPSC Hellenic Handgun Championship
Match Results - 2008 IPSC Hellenic Handgun Championship
Match Results - 2010 IPSC Hellenic Handgun Championship
Match Results - 2011 IPSC Hellenic Handgun Championship
Match Results - 2012 IPSC Hellenic Handgun Championship
Match Results - 2013 IPSC Hellenic Handgun Championship
Match Results - 2014 IPSC Hellenic Handgun Championship
Match Results - 2016 IPSC Hellenic Handgun Championship

IPSC shooting competitions
National shooting championships
Greece sport-related lists
Shooting competitions in Greece